The Memorial Medal of Tree of Peace (Slovak: Pamätná medaila Stromu pokoja) is the second highest award awarded since 2020 by Servare et Manere, the Slovak non-governmental organization. The award was first awarded on September 28, 2020, on the occasion of the second anniversary of the international project Tree of Peace.

Criteria 
Servare et Manere expresses the gratitude by awarding a Memorial Medal of Tree of Peace, which may be granted to personalities, who are personally involved in planting, or people and governmental or non-governmental organizations who have made a contribution to spreading ideas of understanding and union among nations, as well as have made a contribution to the spreading and implementation of the project. This award is also given for significant environmental merits leading to sustainable development of human society and use of natural resources. It is the only and at the same time the highest award that can also be awarded posthumously (In memoriam). The number of laureates is limited to 60 people including organizations. Laureates are included in a special register. The award was established on January 1, 2020. The Memorial Medal of the Tree of Peace is awarded usually on September 28, on the anniversary of the establishment of the project, or in exceptional cases.

Appearance 
The Medal is struck from copper and its diameter is 40 mm and the ribbon is 38 mm wide. The award is divided into men's and women's variant. The laureate can be awarded by the Medal in a Special class with rubies for an exceptional merit. The award in its category as one of the few Slovak awards, together with the decree, meets all phaleristic criteria.

Laureates

References

External links 

 

Awards established in 2020
International awards
Peace awards